Bobby McKee, MBE (1941 – 24 January 2021) was a Unionist politician in Larne, Northern Ireland and former member of the Ulster Volunteer Force.

McKee was a Democratic Unionist Party councillor and a member of Larne Borough Council since 1989. He served as a Mayor of Larne in 2004 and 2008. His brother Jack McKee, who died in 2015, was a DUP councillor in Larne and subsequently a member of the Traditional Unionist Voice.

He lost both his legs in 1974 as the result of an Irish Republican Army car bomb when he was a member of the UVF. A founder member and chairman of the N.I. Amputees Association he was also chairman of Larne Disabled Fitness Suite. Bobby was Vice chairman of C.A.B. and was a member for 10 years. A member of N.I. Housing Council for 15 years he served as a board member for 6 years. He received the MBE in 2004 in recognition of his work in politics.

In 2009, McKee led a welcoming delegation to the Catholic Ancient Order of Hibernians at Larne Borough Council headquarters in an attempt to boost cross community relations in the area in what was described as a historic day. In 2010 McKee condemned a British National Party leafleting campaign in Larne regarding a new refugee centre being built in the town and accused the BNP of whipping up racial tension.

In January 2011, he was involved in a car crash where his car went through the front window of an insurance shop in Larne. No one was injured in the incident.

References

1941 births
2021 deaths
British amputees
Democratic Unionist Party councillors
Mayors of places in Northern Ireland
Ulster Volunteer Force members
Members of the Order of the British Empire
Car bomb victims
British terrorism victims